Mad About You is an American television sitcom starring Paul Reiser and Helen Hunt as a married couple in New York City. It initially aired on NBC from September 23, 1992, to May 24, 1999, winning numerous awards including four Golden Globe Awards and twelve Primetime Emmy Awards. On March 6, 2019, a limited season 8 revival was picked up by Spectrum Originals for 12 episodes.

Plot
The series focuses mainly on newlyweds Paul Buchman, a documentary filmmaker, and Jamie Stemple Buchman, a public relations specialist, as they deal with everything from humorous daily minutiae to major struggles. Near the end of the show's run, they have a baby daughter, whom they name Mabel. They live in Greenwich Village in Lower Manhattan. The 2019 limited series focuses on Paul and Jamie as empty nesters as Mabel starts college at New York University, five blocks away.

Production
Helen Hunt and Paul Reiser were paid $1 million per episode for the last season (with their contracts calling for them to be paid equally). However, ratings fell sharply that year as the series was shuffled away from its Tuesday slot to prop up a fledgling Monday night line-up of comedies on NBC.

The show's theme song, "Final Frontier", was composed by Reiser and Don Was. It was originally performed by Andrew Gold. The cover version in the opening is performed by The Sonora's Tucson Band, but a version performed by Anita Baker made its debut in Season 5, Episode 13, though it was not so credited until Season 5, Episode 18. Baker's rendering was used in 18 episodes of the last three seasons, and appears on the show's soundtrack album. Gold's version is also available on the collection Thank You for Being a Friend: The Best of Andrew Gold.

Exterior views of buildings were filmed in Manhattan. Paul and Jamie's New York City Apartment was located at 5th Avenue and 12th Street. The Old Town Bar and Restaurant on 45 E. 18th Street was used for the fictional Riff's Restaurant in the series.

Revival
In April 2018, it was announced that Sony Pictures Television would revive the show with the two lead actors reprising their roles, though Reiser expressed doubt about it in July 2018. In September 2018, Reiser stated that the revival was still on the table, but that "the studio needs to figure out if they know how to do it."

On March 6, 2019, the series was revived for an eighth season by Spectrum Originals, described as a 12-episode limited series, with Reiser and Hunt confirmed to reprise their roles. On September 5, 2019, it was announced that the first six episodes of the revival would premiere on November 20, 2019, and another six episodes would be released on December 18, 2019. The series is available in a traditional manner in Canada, with its episodes airing on the CTV Comedy Channel.

Many of the main and recurring cast members reprised their roles for the revival, which ignored the events of the season 7 finale (a flash-forward story that told how the Buchmans would fare over the next 20+ years).  The most notable former main cast member not to reprise her role was Leila Kenzle, who played Jamie's best friend, Fran Devanow. Kenzle retired from acting in 2003 and became a psychotherapist. Fran's husband, Mark, does return in the revival, but the character is now remarried.

Cast and characters

Original run (1992–1999)
Main
 Paul Reiser as Paul Buchman, a filmmaker. After attending the New York University Film School, he struggled for recognition before finally succeeding in filmmaking in New York City. He and his family reside near Union Square, on lower Fifth Avenue.
 Helen Hunt as Jamie Buchman (née Stemple, born February 19, 1963), the younger daughter of Gus and Theresa Stemple (although in several episodes, Jamie's birthdate is portrayed as November 11 and also February 11). On moving to New York, she took a job at Farrer-Gantz Public Relations, eventually rising to the position of Regional Vice President. After leaving Farrer-Gantz to continue her education, Jamie started her own public relations firm, which was eventually consolidated into City Hall's press department, under Director of Communications Lance Brockwell. When Brockwell set his sights on the Mayor's mansion, he selected Jamie as his campaign manager. After seven boyfriends at Yale University, she met Paul Buchman at a New York newsstand shortly before Christmas in 1989 by stealing his copy of The New York Times with an implausible excuse. The two married in April 1992. Her difficult relationship with her mother-in-law is an ongoing source of jokes on the show. The character also appeared in the Friends episode "The One with Two Parts, Part 1".
 Maui as Murray, the Buchmans' dog. He was a puppy when Paul found him, and Paul met Jamie while walking him. He sometimes chases what the couple assume is an invisible mouse, and often ends up crashing into the bedroom wall. In a later episode, Jamie discovers that there is indeed a real mouse that Murray has been chasing. In the two-part series finale, The Final Frontier, adult Mabel says that Murray died when she was six, but she was not told until she was twelve. Twice voted the most popular dog by the readers of TV Guide, Murray is loyal and endearing while being very laid back and a bit thick-skulled. Maui was originally found in a Castaic, California, animal shelter by noted Hollywood animal trainer Boone Narr. Maui weighed 58 pounds and was primarily trained by Betty Linn. His first assignments came in TV commercials and as the backup for the top dog in the feature film Bingo.
 Anne Ramsay as Lisa Stemple (seasons 1–5; recurring season 7), Jamie's older sister. Lisa has unfathomable psychological issues. Jamie is referred to as "Stella" in a book written by Lisa's therapist: "It was Stella's overprotectiveness that suffocated her ability to relate to others, and tethered her to a lifetime of insecurity and neurosis." After an envious rage, she blames Jamie for all of her problems in an interview with her shrink that becomes a chapter of a book called "Manics." With no place else to go, she does her laundry at Paul's and Jamie's apartment while scavenging through her sister's clothes and food. Every visit from her parents triggers her eating disorder. In between bouts of weirdness, she still cares deeply for Paul and Jamie and is often trusted to house sit for them, usually with unfortunate results.  Though billed in the opening credits of every episode of seasons 1 through 5, the character appeared less frequently over time, and was in only 22 of the 48 episodes produced in seasons 4 and 5.  Anne Ramsay left the show entirely in season 6, but returned for recurring appearances in season 7.
 Leila Kenzle as Fran Devanow (seasons 1–6; guest season 7), Jamie's best friend. She is the regional vice president at Farrer-Gantz Public Relations who hired Jamie as her assistant. Near 1989, Fran quits Farrer-Gantz to spend time with her obnoxious five-year-old son, Ryan, and husband, Mark. Jamie is then promoted to Fran's position. Fran and Mark's relationship lasts 10 years, and their separation shocks Jamie and Paul. After divorcing Mark, Fran returns to her old position at Farrer-Gantz, since Jamie had quit. Eventually, Fran also quits and goes into business with Jamie. In time, Fran and Mark reconcile. The character also appeared in sitcom Friends (The One With The Two Parts Part One).
 Richard Kind as Dr. Mark Devanow (season 1; recurring seasons 2–5 & 7), Fran's melodramatic ex-husband, with whom she is on good terms. A former obstetrician, Mark left Fran and their young son because he felt smothered and wanted to see the world. After returning to New York, he converts to Buddhism and works for a grocery store, although ultimately he returns to his old profession. In due course, he wins Fran back. 
 John Pankow as Ira Buchman (seasons 2–7; recurring season 1), Paul's cousin. He first appears in the episode "The Wedding Affair." Ira is from the Sheepshead Bay section of Brooklyn. He worked for Paul's father, Burt, at Buchman's Sporting Goods. Paul and Ira have a close friendship, but their hidden rivalry came out when Ira took ownership of Buchman's Sporting Goods upon Burt's retirement. Ira made Paul a silent partner in the store due to the mistaken belief that Paul resents his inheriting the store. Ira is a compulsive gambler and often takes Paul with him on Atlantic City junkets without Jamie's knowledge. When he remembers to, Ira attends Gamblers Anonymous meetings. Even so, he frequently appears as loving and supportive towards Paul and Jamie. 
 Cynthia Harris as Sylvia Buchman (seasons 6–7; recurring seasons 2–5), Paul's mother. Sylvia almost always gives Jamie a hard time, but occasionally does show kindness towards her daughter-in-law.
 Louis Zorich as Burt Buchman (seasons 6–7; guest seasons 1–2; recurring seasons 3–5), Paul's father. Burt runs a sporting goods store – until he passes it on to Ira upon retirement. His signature line in the show occurs whenever he visits Paul and Jamie's apartment, exclaiming at the door, "It's me, Burt!  Burt Buchman—your father!"
 Alyssa and Justin Baric (twins) as Mabel Buchman, Paul and Jamie's daughter. She was finally named when Jamie's overbearing mother proclaimed that "Mothers Always Bring Extra Love", an homage to The Dick Van Dyke Show where Rob and Laura explain Ritchie's middle name. Alyssa and Justin Baric played Mabel from the beginning of season six when Mabel was brought home from the hospital ("Coming Home"). They continued to play the role of Mabel for numerous episodes. Carter and Madison Gale play the role at a later time. In the season six episode "Letters to Mabel," an 18-year-old Mabel is played by Meredith Bishop. In the series finale, a teen Mabel is played by Cara DeLizia, and an adult Mabel is played by Janeane Garofalo.

Recurring roles and guest stars
 Jerry Adler as Mr. Wicker, the apartment building superintendent (10 episodes)
 Hank Azaria as Nat Ostertag, Jamie and Paul's dog walker (15 episodes)
 Robin Bartlett (29 episodes) and Talia Balsam (1 episode) as Debbie Buchman, Paul's sister.
 Patrick Bristow as Troy, Jamie's scheming office underling (5 episodes)
 Mel Brooks as Uncle Phil, Paul's uncle (4 episodes)
 Carol Burnett (10 episodes) and Penny Fuller (4 episodes) and Nancy Dussault (1 episode) as Theresa Stemple, Jamie's mother.
 Mo Gaffney as Dr. Sheila Kleinman, Jamie and Paul's therapist (13 episodes)
 Jeff Garlin as Marvin, Ira's employee and semi-pro wrestler (13 episodes)
 Judy Geeson as Maggie Conway, British neighbor across the hall (32 episodes)
 Tommy Hinkley as Jay Selby, Paul's college friend (13 episodes, season 1 only). The disappearance of Selby is never explained, a fact referred to in season 5, episode 21 ("Guardianhood")
 Lisa Kudrow as Ursula Buffay, absent-minded waitress at Riff's (24 episodes). The character also appeared in the sitcom, Friends (1994-2004), in which Phoebe, a co-lead character played by Kudrow, was written as Ursula's twin sister.
 Cyndi Lauper as Marianne Lugasso, Ira's on and off girlfriend/ex-wife (5 episodes)
 Lyle Lovett (2 episodes)
 Gates McFadden as Allison Rourke, Paul Buchman's boss (4 episodes)
 Larry Miller as Lou Bonaparte (5 episodes)
 Carroll O'Connor (4 episodes) and John Karlen (3 episodes) and Paul Dooley (1 episode) as Gus Stemple, Jamie's father
 George O. Petrie as Sid, Paul's film editor colleague (10 episodes)
 Suzie Plakson as Dr. Joan Golfinos, Debbie Buchman's life partner (and Jamie's Ob/Gyn for a while) (18 episodes)
 Alan Ruck as Lance Brockwell (4 episodes)
 Eric Stoltz as Alan Tofsky, Jamie's ex-boyfriend (6 episodes)
 Paxton Whitehead as Maggie's first and third husband Hal (9 episodes)
 Jim Piddock as Maggie's second husband Hal (7 episodes)
 Steven Wright as Warren Mermelman (5 episodes)
 Scott Atkinson as Doug the Handyman (season 5, episode 12: "The Handyman")

Other notable guest stars

 Andre Agassi (season 2, episode 15)
 Ed Asner (2 episodes)
 John Astin (season 2, episode 23)
 Kevin Bacon (season 5, episode 7)
 Lewis Black (season 6, episode 7)
 Christie Brinkley (season 2, episode 15)
 Garth Brooks (season 2, episode 23)
 Michael Buffer (season 7, episode 17)
 Steve Buscemi (season 1, episode 7)
 Sid Caesar (season 5, episode 15)
 James Cameron (season 6, episode 23)
 Dan Castellaneta (season 7, episode 10)
 William Christopher (season 7, episode 2)
 Tim Conway (season 7, episodes 21–22)
 Ellen DeGeneres (season 6, episode 23)
 Paul Dooley (season 1, episode 5)
 Nancy Dussault (season 1, episode 5)
 Patrick Ewing (season 3, episode 20)
 Jamie Farr (season 7, episode 16)
 Barbara Feldon (season 1, episode 20)
 Janeane Garofalo (season 7, episodes 21–22)
 Brad Garrett (season 4, episode 18)
 Marita Geraghty (season 3, episode 10)
 Steven Gilborn (Season 5 episode 13)
 Rudolph "Rudy" Giuliani (season 3, episode 10)
 Al Gore (season 6, episode 10)
 Kerri Green (season 1, episode 4)
 Seth Green (season 5, episode 21)
 Billy Joel (season 7, episode 15)
Bruno Kirby (season 5, episode 9)
 Robert Klein (season 7, episode 9)
 Nathan Lane (season 6, episode 11)
 Phil Leeds (season 1, episode 6)
 Eugene Levy (season 6, episode 22)
 Jerry Lewis (season 1, episode 17)
 Mark McGwire (season 7, episode 13)
 Michael Moore (season 5, episode 23)
 Yoko Ono (season 4, episode 6)
 Regis Philbin (season 1, episode 18)
 Sydney Pollack (season 6, episode 13)
 Beata Poźniak (season 1, episode 12)
 Carl Reiner as Alan Brady (season 3, episode 16)
 Michael Richards as Cosmo Kramer (season 1, episode 8)
 Alex Rocco (season, 5, episode 7)
 Al Roker (season 3, episode 6)
 Jerry Seinfeld (season 7, episode 1)
 Brent Spiner (season 3, episode 15)
 Carol Ann Susi (season 1, episode 9)
 Wayne Tippit (season 1, episode 11)
 Patrick Warburton (season 1, episode 16)
 Bruce Willis (season 5, episode 24)
 Randy Savage (season 7, episode 17)

Revival (2019)
Main
 Paul Reiser as Paul Buchman
 Helen Hunt as Jamie Buchman (née Stemple)
 Anne Ramsay as Lisa Stemple, Jamie's older sister
 John Pankow as Ira Buchman, Paul's cousin
 Abby Quinn as Mabel Buchman, Paul and Jamie's daughter
 Richard Kind as Dr. Mark Devanow
 Kecia Lewis as Tonya, Mark's new wife
 Antoinette LaVecchia as Lucia Francavella, Ira's girlfriend then fiancée

Returning
 Cynthia Harris as Sylvia Buchman, Paul's mother
 Jeff Garlin as Marvin
 Jerry Adler as Mr. Wicker
 Carol Burnett as Theresa Stemple, Jamie's mother
 Mo Gaffney as Dr. Sheila Kleinman, psychiatrist

Recurring
 Asif Ali as Rishi
 Sofia Hasmik as Ashta
 Makena Lei Gordon as Shannon
 Kimia Bellpoornia as Yasmeen

Other
 Cloris Leachman as Mrs. Mandelbaum, one of Jamie's therapy patients
 Jason Alexander as himself
 Blake Cooper Griffin as Aaron
 Omar Adam as Craig
 Jennifer Westfeldt as Donna Lawson
 Jean Smart as Chelsea Stevens-Kobolakis
 Isaac Cheung as Waiter
 Joe Gillette as Vincent Maslin
 Christina Marie Karis as Mara Buckland
 Dylan Mattina as a New York City pedestrian
 Layla Mohammadi as Meg Martin
 Thomas Daniel Smith as Mark Buckland

Episodes

Crossovers
Mad About You has had numerous connections to other NBC sitcoms set in New York City, as well as various other programs.

Friends (owned by Warner Bros. Television): Lisa Kudrow played the recurring role of Ursula, a flaky waitress at Riff's Bar, a local restaurant that Paul and Jamie frequented. Kudrow went on to star in the NBC sitcom Friends, playing the also somewhat flaky character of Phoebe Buffay, and for a time both series shared the same Thursday night line-up. While not originally intended, the characters of Ursula and Phoebe were later found to be identical twin sisters. In a Friends episode ("The One With The Two Parts", 1st Season), as part of a night of NBC sitcom crossovers, Jamie and Fran walk into Central Perk and mistake Phoebe for Ursula. Hunt and Kenzle were not identified on screen as Jamie and Fran. In the season three episode "Pandora's Box", Jamie causes a citywide power blackout in New York City, and the effects of the blackout are seen in the Friends episode, "The One with the Blackout", and there was also a blackout in the episode "Birthday in the Big House" of the short-lived NBC sitcom Madman of the People. All three episodes originally aired during the evening of November 3, 1994, alongside a Seinfeld episode which did not incorporate the blackout premise.

Seinfeld: In one episode ("The Apartment", 1st Season), Paul, pressured by Jamie, decides to sign over the lease of his old "bachelor pad" to the current tenant who is subleasing. When the tenant is revealed to be Cosmo Kramer (Michael Richards) of Seinfeld, Paul asks Kramer "What ever happened to that Jerry guy who used to live there?" Seinfeld, however, twice contradicted this connection, once even featuring a running joke about George's distaste for his fiancée Susan's fondness for watching Mad About You. In the Mad About You season seven episode "Season Opener", Paul, under the effects of Viagra, ran into Jerry Seinfeld in the street, who tells Paul to go away. At this point in Seinfelds chronology, Jerry Seinfeld was supposed to be in prison.

The Dick Van Dyke Show: Carl Reiner reprised the role of Alan Brady from the 1960s sitcom. The episode made several references to the older show, such as Jamie at one point crying and whining "Oh, Paul!" – a take on Mary Tyler Moore's character Laura Petrie's frequent refrain "Oh, Rob!" – Ten episodes earlier, Paul almost trips over a box and says, "Get me, I'm Dick Van Dyke."

Style & Substance: In the 2019 revival ("Real Estate for Beginners", 8th Season), Jean Smart appeared as Chelsea Stevens-Kobolakis, a controlling, abrasive, short-tempered character that she had previously portrayed in showrunner Peter Tolan's short-lived 1998 series. Paul and Jamie attend a weekend team-building workshop that Chelsea hosts, mistakenly thinking that it's the marriage counseling seminar which is being held in a nearby room.

Nielsen ratings
 1992–93: #54 (10.18 rating)
 1993–94: #31 (12.69 rating)
 1994–95: #11 (15.2 rating)
 1995–96: #37 (10.8 rating)
 1996–97: #24 (11.0 rating)
 1997–98: #32 (13.4 million viewers)
 1998–99: #85 (9.1 million viewers)

Awards

Mad About You won a Golden Globe Award, a Peabody Award, a Genesis Award, received five Emmy Award nominations for Outstanding Comedy Series, and was chosen Best Quality Comedy by the Viewers for Quality Television. Helen Hunt won the Primetime Emmy Award for Outstanding Lead Actress – Comedy Series four years in a row (1996–99).

Media

Soundtrack
In 1997, Atlantic Records released a Mad About You soundtrack. The soundtrack from and inspired by the sitcom, is composed of fun and sentimental songs and clips from the show. The tracks are organized chronologically marking the milestones of the couple's relationship. The album is bookended by the two versions of Paul Reiser's song "Final Frontier"—the first track is the classic version used in the show's opening, and the last track is Anita Baker's jazzy, full-length rendition, with Reiser on keyboard. The 21 tracks are as follows:

 "Final Frontier (TV Theme)" – Andrew Gold/The Sonora's Tucson Band
 "Who I Am" – Faith Hill
 "No Pressure" – Paul Reiser & Helen Hunt
 "I've Been Lonely Too Long" – The Young Rascals
 "At Last" – Etta James
 "That's Marriage?" – Paul Reiser & Helen Hunt
 "Ice Cream" – Sarah McLachlan
 "I Love the Way You Love Me" – Eric Martin
 "Nobody Knows Me" – Lyle Lovett
 "Sneaky Feelings" – Elvis Costello
 "A Talk in the Park" – Paul Reiser & Helen Hunt
 "Love and Forgiveness" – Julia Fordham
 "A Magic Moment" – Paul Reiser & Helen Hunt
 "The Things We've Handed Down" – Marc Cohn
 "Lullaby for You" – BeBe Winans
 "She Crawls Away" – Hootie & the Blowfish
 "My First Child" – Nil Lara
 "Beautiful Boy (Darling Boy)" – John Lennon
 "Baby Girl" – The Tony Rich Project
 "Unconditional Love" – Paul Reiser & Helen Hunt
 "Mad About You – The Final Frontier" – Anita Baker

Home media
Sony Pictures Home Entertainment has released the first three seasons of Mad About You on DVD in Region 1 and 4. The first two seasons were also made available in Region 2. No subsequent seasons were released by Sony Pictures Home Entertainment.

In February 2010, Shout! Factory acquired the distribution rights to the remaining seasons of Mad About You on DVD. They subsequently released seasons 4 and 5 on DVD.

On August 27, 2013, it was announced that Mill Creek Entertainment had acquired the rights to various television series from the Sony Pictures library including Mad About You.  They subsequently re-released the first and second seasons on DVD on August 5, 2014.

Mill Creek released the complete series on a 14-DVD set on May 3, 2016.

As of August 1, 2019, the entire series has been available to Spectrum subscribers as part of the run-up to the premiere of the revival series.

On December 8, 2020, the revival season, alongside the original series, was added to Amazon Prime Video.

Season releases

Best-of releases

Adaptations
A Chilean adaptation under the title Loco por ti (translated as Crazy About You) aired on TVN during 2004.

An Argentine adaptation under the title Loco por vos (translated as Crazy About You) stylized as Loco x vos aired on Telefe from September 5 until December 29, 2016. The second season was originally going to air in 2017 but was scrapped later on.

A British adaptation under the title Loved by You aired for two seasons on ITV from 11 March 1997 until 27 August 1998.

An Italian adaptation under the title Innamorati pazzi (Crazy Lovers) aired on Italia 1 from 1998 until 2003

A Chinese adaptation aired on Dragon TV on January 4, 2016.

References

External links
 
 Mad About You at faqs.org site

1992 American television series debuts
1999 American television series endings
2019 American television series debuts
2019 American television series endings
1990s American romantic comedy television series
1990s American sitcoms
2010s American romantic comedy television series
2010s American sitcoms
American television series revived after cancellation
Best Musical or Comedy Series Golden Globe winners
English-language television shows
Friends (1994 TV series)
Jewish comedy and humor
Television series about Jews and Judaism
NBC original programming
Peabody Award-winning television programs
Primetime Emmy Award-winning television series
Television franchises
Television series about marriage
Television series by Sony Pictures Television
Television shows set in Manhattan
Spectrum Originals original programming